Charlie is a small unincorporated community in northern Clay County. The town is located on FM 810, about 21 miles north of Henrietta and is about 20 miles northeast of Wichita Falls.

History
The town was founded in 1878 as Big Wichita Valley. Henry T. Dunn built a small general store just south of the Red River and later sold the store to Charlie Taylor in the early 1880s. The town was later renamed after Taylor and a post office opened in 1882. By the mid-1920s, the town's population had surpassed 200. The town's population went down during the Great Depression and World War II, with the post office closing in the 1930s. The Charlie School, known as Charlie Common School District #36, consolidated with Petrolia schools in 1941.  Between the 1970s and early 2000s, the town's population was estimated to be about 65.

Climate
The climate in this area is characterized by hot, humid summers and generally mild to cool winters.  According to the Köppen Climate Classification system, Charlie has a humid subtropical climate, abbreviated "Cfa" on climate maps.

References

Unincorporated communities in Clay County, Texas
Unincorporated communities in Texas
Wichita Falls metropolitan area